Melongena is a genus of sea snails, marine gastropod mollusks in the family Melongenidae, the crown conches and their allies.

Species
Species within the genus Melongena include:
 † Melongena basilica (Bellardi, 1873) 
 Melongena bispinosa (Philippi, 1844)
 † Melongena californica Anderson & Martin, 1914 
 Melongena corona (Gmelin, 1791) - crown conch - synonym:  Melongena subcoronata
 † Melongena lainei (Basterot, 1825) 
 Melongena melongena (Linnaeus, 1758) - type species
 † Melongena murifactor Vermeij & Raven, 2009 
 Melongena patula  (Linnaeus, 1758) 
 † Melongena pontonxensis Lozouet, 2021 
 † Melongena woodwardi (Roxo, 1924) - from Miocene of the Pebas Formation

Synonyms
 Melongena belknapi Petit de la Saussaye, 1852: synonym of Melongena corona (Gmelin, 1791)
 Melongena bicolor (Say, 1826): synonym of Melongena corona (Gmelin, 1791)
 Melongena fasciata Schumacher, 1817: synonym of Melongena melongena (Linnaeus, 1758)
 Melongena paradisiaca (Röding, 1798): synonym of Volema paradisiaca Röding, 1798 : synonym of Volema pyrum (Gmelin, 1791) (previous combination)
 Melongena perspinosa Pilsbry & Vanatta, 1934 accepted as Melongena corona (Gmelin, 1791)
 Melongena pirum Dautzenberg, 1929: synonym of Volema pyrum (Gmelin, 1791)
 Melongena sprucecreekensis Tucker, 1994: synonym of Melongena corona (Gmelin, 1791)
 † Melongena vigneauxi Magne & Vergneau-Saubade, 1970: synonym of † Melongena basilica (Bellardi, 1873) 

The shells of Melongena species are extremely variable in shape and sculpture, and historically this has meant that a large number of different forms have been named, creating numerous synonyms.
	
There is still some disagreement about how many modern species of Melongena actually exist. However, phylogenetic analysis indicate that there are only three species in the Western Atlantic, with all snails in coastal Florida being referred to Melongena corona.

Distribution
The genus Melongena occurs only in the tropical Americas. It appears that three nominally valid species occur in the tropics of the western Atlantic: one in Florida, one in the Yucatan, and one in Central America and the Caribbean. A fourth species is found on the tropical eastern Pacific coast.

Habitat
Species within this genus live in the tropical intertidal zone, in muddy areas such as under mangrove trees.

Life habits
Melongena snails are carnivorous, primarily preying on small bivalves (clams, mussels and oysters). They will also feed on other species of snails and have been known to be cannibalistic.

References

Further reading
 Abbott, R. Tucker, 1986. Seashells of North America, St. Martin's Press, New York	
 Keen, A. Myra, 1971. Sea shells of tropical west America, Stanford University Press, Stanford, California
 Anderson, F.M., and B. Martin, 1914. "Neocene records in the Temblor Basin, California, and Neocene deposits of the San Juan District, San Luis Obispo County",  California Academy of Sciences Proceedings, 4th series, v. IV, p. 14-112.

External links 

Melongenidae
Extant Miocene first appearances